Agnidra tanyospinosa is a moth in the family Drepanidae. It was described by Hong-Fu Chu and Lin-Yao Wang in 1988. It is found in Guangdong, China.

The length of the forewings is about 17 mm. Adults are similar to Agnidra corticata, but have whitish patches on the cells of the wings.

References

Moths described in 1988
Drepaninae
Moths of Asia